The 2017 season is Persib Bandung's 84th competitive season. Along with Liga 1, the club will compete in cup tournaments which yet to be announced. The season covers the period from 1 January 2017 to 31 December 2017.

Month by month review

Before the season begins, persib bandung had followed the preseason tournament, the President Cup. Different from the previous year, now the club dubbed "maung bandung" it failed to achieve the preseason title for the second time. Now, they are only able to sit in third place.

Before the league started, precisely at the time Persib celebrate his birthday at the age of 84 years, Persib managed to bring in a line of former world-class players, one of which is Michael Essien who could strengthen Chelsea. Essien own presence somewhat special because Essien arrived at the time Persib celebrate birthday. Not long after, Persib Bandung also introduced Carlton Cole, former West Ham United player as his new player. All parties are hoping Persib can look extraordinary in league 1.

At the beginning of the season, performan performance is quite good. Persib was always on the path of competition to the championship ladder. Soon, Persib performance slowly decreased so that defeat after defeat always experienced Persib. Djajang Nurdjaman, as a coach persib always urged to resign from his position due to poor performance experienced Persib Bandung. Djanur had time to apply for his retirement to the management Persib, but rejected. After appealing for a second resignation, Djanur officially resigned on July 16, 2017, after a match between Mitra Kukar against Persib with a score of 1-2 ended in defeat for Persib. Now his position is temporarily replaced by Herrie Setiawan who is an assistant from Djanur.

Coaching staff

{|class="wikitable"
|-
!Position
!Staff
|-
|First-team Manager|| Herrie Setiawan (Caretaker)
|-
||Assistant Manager|| Asep Sumantri
|-
|-
|Goalkeeper Coach|| Anwar Sanusi
|-
|Fitness Coach|| Yaya Sunarya
|-
|Under-21 Team Manager|| Budiman Yunus
|-

Squad information

First team squad

New contracts

Transfers

In

Out

Pre-season

Competitions

Overview 

{| class="wikitable" style="text-align: center"
|-
!rowspan=2|Competition
!colspan=8|Record
!rowspan=2|Started round
!rowspan=2|Final position / round
!rowspan=2|First match	
!rowspan=2|Last match
|-
!
!
!
!
!
!
!
!
|-
| Liga 1

| —
| In Progress
| 15 April 2017
| In Progress
|-
! Total

Liga 1

League table

Results summary

Results by matchday

Matches

First round

Second Round

References

Persib Bandung
Persib Bandung seasons